Via Traiana is a street in southern Italy.

Via Traiana may also refer to:
 Via Traiana Nova in Arabia
 Via Traiana Pataesina in Dacia